Eveliina Similä (born 10 April 1978) is a Finnish retired ice hockey player. She competed in 73 matches with the Finnish national team, including the women's tournament at the 2006 Winter Olympics and the IIHF World Championship in 2004 and 2005. Representing Finland, she won a World Championship bronze medal in 2004.

In Finland, she played with Ilves and HPK of the Naisten SM-sarja and won the Finnish Championship twice, with Ilves in 2006 and with HPK in 2011. In 2012, she won a bronze medal with HPK at the IIHF European Women's Champions Cup tournament.

References

External links
 

1978 births
Living people
Finnish women's ice hockey forwards
Olympic ice hockey players of Finland
Ice hockey players at the 2006 Winter Olympics
People from Akaa
Ilves Naiset players
HPK Kiekkonaiset players
Sportspeople from Pirkanmaa